Bruay-la-Buissière is a commune in the Pas-de-Calais department in the Hauts-de-France region in northern France.

Geography

History
With four coal mines, it was the headquarters of the Bruay Mining Company. The coal mines closed during the 1960s, to be replaced by light industrial work and chemical factories. In April 1972 the murder of miner's daughter Brigitte Dewevre became a politicized event when Pierre Leroy, a local middle-class lawyer associated with the local mining company, was arrested: La Cause du Peuple, the paper of the Maoist Gauche prolétarienne, publicized the case with the headline 'Bruay: And Now They Are Massacring Our Children!'

The two former communes of Bruay-en-Artois and Labuissière were joined as one commune in 1987.

Population

The population data given in the table and graph below for 1982 and earlier refer to the former commune of Bruay-en-Artois.

Sights
 The Hôtel de Ville (Town Hall), 47 m tall built in 1927. The windows recount scenes from the lives of miners.
 The Art Deco swimming pool, built in 1936 (the last remaining Art Deco pool open to the public)
 The Museum of mining.
 The Church of Saint Martin, dating from the fifteenth century, was expanded and renovated in 1974.
 Ballencourt manor in Labuissière, was built in 1777. Partially renovated, it now hosts the music school.
 The donjon of the castle of La Buissière, built in 1310 by Mahaut, Countess of Artois.
 The church at Labuissière, presently closed to the public for renovation work.
 The Velodrome at Labuissière built by the Bruay Mining Co., in 1925.
 The Museum of calculation and Scripture. Traces the history of writing and calculating machines such as the Enigma German coding machine.

See also
Communes of the Pas-de-Calais department

References

External links

 The CWGC graves in the Bruay-la-Buissière communal cemetery
 Official website of the commune 
 A website about the commune 
 Website of the Communauté du Bruaysis 

Communes of Pas-de-Calais
County of Artois